Thomas Walkyngton was Dean of Exeter between 1378 and 1385.

Notes

Deans of Exeter